Semizbughy is a mountain massif in Bukhar-Zhyrau District, Karaganda Region, Kazakhstan.

Semizbughy is the highest point in the district. Semizhbugy mining village is located on the western side, at the foot of the mountain.

Geography 
Semizbughy is a small massif, part of the Kazakh Uplands. It has a gentle and smooth relief and rises above the southern shore of lake Rudnichnoye, to the north of the northwestern slopes of the Ayr Mountains.

Flora
The slopes of mount Semizbughy are covered with low vegetation, including sedges, alpine oatgrass and fescue.

See also
Geography of Kazakhstan

References

External links
 VeloKaraganda / Semizbuga 2009

Kazakh Uplands
Mountains of Kazakhstan

kk:Семізбұғы (тау, Қарағанды облысы)